Gumel or Gumal (as the natives call it) is a city and traditional emirate in Jigawa State, Nigeria.

Geography
Gumel is located 120 km northeast of Kano, and lies about 20 km south of Nigeria's northern border with Niger. As of 2007 the estimated population of Gumel was 44,158.
Gumel, also spelled Gummel, town and traditional emirate, northern Jigawa state, northern Nigeria. The emirate was founded about 1750 by Dan Juma of Kano city (75 miles [121 km] southwest) and his followers of the Manga (Mangawa) tribe. Shortly after his death in 1754, it became a tributary state of the Bornu kingdom. The emirate survived the Fulani attacks of Usman dan Fodio’s jihad (“holy war”) in the early 19th century and never became part of the Fulani empire of Sokoto. In 1845 Gumel’s capital was moved from Tumbi (20 miles north in present-day Niger) to the present site. Wars with nearby Hadejia, Kano, and Zinder (Damagaram) plagued the emirate from 1828; the war with Hadejia continued until Gumel’s emir, Abdullahi, was killed in battle in 1872. Slave raids toward the end of the century by Damagaram further depopulated Gumel. Emir Ahmadu submitted to the British in 1903, and the Gumel emirate was incorporated into Kano province. In 1976 it became part of Kano state, and since 1991 it has been part of Jigawa state.

Gumel town remains the area’s chief market centre—millet and sorghum are the staple foods—and serves as a collecting point for peanuts (groundnuts), which are trucked to Kano city for export by rail. Limestone and diatomaceous earth deposits are exploited locally in scattered areas. The town has a farm-training centre and an advanced teacher-training college. Gumel lies on a secondary highway linking it to Kano and Hadejia and is a hub for local roads serving northern Jigawa state. Pop. (2006) local government area, 107,161.

History
The emirate was founded about 1750 by Dan Juma and his followers from the Mangawa tribe. Shortly after he died in 1754, it became a tributary state of the Bornu kingdom. The emirate survived the Fulani attacks of Usman dan Fodio's jihad in the early 19th century and never became part of the Fulani empire of Sokoto.  The present-day location of Gumel is the result of an 1845 move from the city of Tumbi, located in what is now Niger. The emirate has frequently been at war with the nearby cities of Hadejia, Danzomo, Kano, and Zinder since 1828. The war with Hadejia continued until Gumel's emir, Abdullahi, died in 1872. Before Emir Ahmadu accepted British rule in 1903, frequent slave raids from the town of Zinder were common. In 1976 Gumel became part of Kano State, and since 1991 it has been part of Jigawa State near Danzomo, Gagarawa, Sule Tankarkar, and Maigatari.

The current emir of Gumel, HRH Alh. Ahmed Mohammed Sani II (CON) is the 16th emir of Gumel. The emir is a graduate, of political science, of Ohio State University in the United States. The emir has been in office since 1981. The emir's palace is accessible only to those invited there by the emir, to members of the royal family, and to officials of the royal court (the emirate council, also called the Majlis).

List of Gumel Emirs
Emirs

 1749 - 1754                Dan Juma I dan Musa
 1754 - 1760                Adamu Karro dan Digadiga Karro            (d. 1760)
 1760 - 1777                Dan Juma II dan Digadiga Karro
 1777 - 1804                Maikota dan Adam Karro                    (d. 1804)
 1804 - 1811                Kalgo dan Maikota                         (d. 1811)
 1811 - 1828                Dan Auwa dan Maikota                      (d. 1828)
 1828 - 1851                Muhamman Dan Tanoma dan Maikota           (d. 1851)
 1851 - 1853                Ceri dan Muhamman Dan Tanoma (1st time)
 1853 - 1855                Muhamman Atu dan Dan Auwa
 1855 - 1861                Ceri dan Muhamman Dan Tanoma (2nd time)
 1861 - 1872                `Abd Allahi dan Muhamman Dan Tanoma       (d. 1872)
 1872 - 18               Abu Bakar dan Muhamman Dan Tanoma         (d. 1896)
 1896 - 1915                Ahmadu dan Abi Bakar
 1915 - 1944                Muhamman na Kota dan Ahmadu               (d. 1944)
 May 1944 - 1981            Maina Muhammad Sani II dan Muhamman na Kota       (b. 1912)
 1981 -                     Ahmad Muhammad Sani II dan Maina Muhammad Sani II

Economy
Gumel acts as the region's primary economic center. Sorghum, millet, and peanuts are collected here and trucked to Kano on a secondary highway where they are exported by rail.

References

Local Government Areas in Jigawa State
Former countries in Africa
Former emirates